The 1990 PGA Championship was the 72nd PGA Championship, held August 9–12 at Shoal Creek Golf and Country Club in Birmingham, Alabama. Wayne Grady won his only major championship, three strokes ahead of runner-up Fred Couples.

In the final round, Couples led by a stroke after a birdie at the 12th hole, but then had four consecutive bogeys, while Grady shot par for the rest of the round. Defending champion Payne Stewart was in the final pairing with Grady, but was two-over par on the front nine. On the par-5 11th hole, he put his third shot into the water and fell from contention with a triple bogey.

Grady became the third Australian-born player to win the PGA Championship, preceded by Jim Ferrier in 1947 and David Graham in 1979. It was Grady's second and final win on the PGA Tour.

Concerns about racial discrimination in the club's membership caused many sponsors to pull their network television advertising, including IBM. This was the final year that ABC carried the broadcast, replaced by CBS in 1991.

Controversy
Leading up to the tournament, Shoal Creek founder Hall Thompson doubled down on the club's policy of excluding African-Americans from membership. Various groups threatened to protest the event and sponsors pulled out, and the PGA considered moving the tournament away from Shoal Creek. In the end, a local African-American executive accepted an invitation to become an honorary member and the tournament was held as planned.

Venue

This was the second PGA Championship at Shoal Creek, which hosted six years earlier in 1984. Opened in 1977, the course was designed by Jack Nicklaus; it was the venue for the Regions Tradition, a senior major championship, from 2011 through 2015, and the U.S. Women's Open in 2018.

Course layout

Previous course lengths for major championships
  – par 72, 1984 PGA Championship

Round summaries

First round
Thursday, August 9, 1990

Second round
Friday, August 10, 1990

Third round
Saturday, August 11, 1990

Final round
Sunday, August 12, 1990

Scorecard

Cumulative tournament scores, relative to par
{|class="wikitable" span = 50 style="font-size:85%;
|-
|style="background: Pink;" width=10|
|Birdie
|style="background: PaleGreen;" width=10|
|Bogey
|style="background: Green;" width=10|
|Double bogey
|style="background: Olive;" width=10|
|Triple bogey+
|}

References

External links
PGA.com – 1990 PGA Championship
Yahoo! Sports: 1990 PGA Championship leaderboard

PGA Championship
Golf in Alabama
Sports competitions in Birmingham, Alabama
PGA Championship
PGA Championship
PGA Championship
PGA Championship